The Pepsi Challenge is an ongoing marketing promotion run by PepsiCo since 1975. It is also the name of a cross country ski race at Giant's Ridge Ski Area in Biwabik, Minnesota, an event sponsored by Pepsi.

Method

The challenge originally took the form of a single blind taste test. At malls, shopping centers, and other public locations, a Pepsi representative sets up a table with two white cups: one containing Pepsi and one with Coca-Cola. Shoppers are encouraged to taste both colas, and then select which drink they prefer. Then the representative reveals the two bottles so the taster can see whether they preferred Coke or Pepsi.  The results of the test leaned toward a consensus that Pepsi was preferred by more Americans. The Pepsi Challenge has been featured in much of Pepsi's TV advertising.

History
The challenge launched in 1975, as part of the ongoing Cola wars between Pepsi and The Coca-Cola Company.
In his book Blink: The Power of Thinking Without Thinking (2005), author Malcolm Gladwell presents evidence that suggests Pepsi's success over Coca-Cola in the "Pepsi Challenge" is a result of the flawed nature of the "sip test" method. His research shows that tasters will generally prefer the sweeter of two beverages based on a single sip, even if they prefer a less sweet beverage over the course of an entire can. Additionally, the challenge more often than not labeled the Pepsi cup with an "M" and the Coca-Cola cup with a "Q," suggesting letter preference may drive some of the results.  Donald M. Kendall of Pepsi promoted the Pepsi Challenge. 

When the preference in blind tests is compared to tests wherein cups are labeled with arbitrary labels (e.g., S or L) or brand names, the ratings of preference change. Scientific findings do support a perceptible difference between Coca-Cola and Pepsi, but not between Pepsi and RC Cola.

In his book Bad Habits, humorist Dave Barry describes the Pepsi challenge as, "Pepsi’s ongoing misguided attempt to convince the general public that Coke and Pepsi are not the same thing, which of course they are."

In 2015, Pepsi relaunched the Pepsi Challenge on social media. As part of this year long promotion, Pepsi signed various celebrity ambassadors to advertise their product on their social media accounts under the hashtag #PepsiChallenge.

Contest
In 1981, Pepsi ran a "Pepsi Challenge Payoff" contest that would hand out a large prize to anyone who could gather Pepsi bottle caps that spelled out the words "Pepsi Challenge".

See also 
Cola Wars
New Coke
Pepsi Cool Cans
Pepsi Stuff

References

Further reading
Koenigs, M., Tranel, D. (2008). Prefrontal cortex damage abolishes brand-cued changes in cola preference. Social Cognitive and Affective Neuroscience, 3, 1–6.
Pronko, N.H., Herman, D.T. (1950). Identification of cola beverages. IV. Postscript. Journal of Applied Psychology, 34, 68–69.

Cola
PepsiCo advertising campaigns
Advertising campaigns
Metaphors referring to food and drink
1975 introductions
Business rivalries